Milan Poredski (21 February 1922 – 7 May 2005) was a Yugoslav cyclist. He competed in the individual and team road race events at the 1948 Summer Olympics.

References

External links
 

1922 births
2005 deaths
Yugoslav male cyclists
Olympic cyclists of Yugoslavia
Cyclists at the 1948 Summer Olympics
Sportspeople from Zagreb